The 1970 season of the Japan Soccer League was the sixth season of Japanese league football. Toyo Industries won their fifth title and set the record for title wins, but they would not regain the title during the rest of the JSL's existence and would not win the successor league, the J. League Division 1, until 2012.

Japan Soccer League

Promotion/relegation Series

No relegations.

Team of the Year

References

1970
1
Jap
Jap